Bikkure ha-Ittim was a Hebrew-language annual published in Vienna from 1820 to 1831. Founded by Salomon Jacob Cohen, it was adopted by the Galician Maskilim as their means to promote culture and education among Galician Jews. The publication was a forerunner of modern Hebrew journalism and played a significant role in the revival of the Hebrew language.

History
Bikkure ha-Ittim originally appeared as a supplement to the Hebrew calendar Ittim Mezumanim. In 1822, it stopped being a supplement and became an independent magazine.

The magazine mostly featured contributions from writers in Galicia, Bohemia, and the Italian-Austrian provinces. It had a significant impact on European Jews in the first half of the 19th century. According to Delitzsch, Bikkure ha-Ittim also became the publication of the New-German school of poetry in Austria, with the influence of Schiller as evident in the magazine as Lessing's influence was in Ha-Me'assef.

The early issues of the magazine contained a mix of Hebrew and German articles (written in Hebrew characters) and reprints from the defunct Ha-Me'assef. The magazine gradually improved in both style and content and eventually became the chief publication for the greatest Hebrew writers of the era, including Samuel David Luzzatto, Solomon Judah Löb Rapoport, and Isaac Samuel Reggio, who contributed to it for many years. Bikkure ha-Ittim also nurtured the talents of many young Hebrew writers, such as Isaac Erter, who published some of his highly regarded papers on elegant composition and wit in the magazine.

Publication of Bikkure ha-Ittim ceased in 1831. Two attempts to revive the journal, one by Max Emanuel Stern in 1844 and another by Isaac Samuel Reggio and Isidor Bush, were unsuccessful.

Notable contributors
Among the periodical's contributors were:

 Abraham Aberle
 Isaac Benjacob
 Jacob Samuel Bick
 Berish Blumenfeld
 David Caro
 Aaron Chorin
 Baruch Czatzkes
 Lelio Della Torre
 Isaac Erter
 Josef Flesch
 Judah Jeitteles
 Max Letteris
 Solomon Judah Löb Rapoport
 Solomon Pergamenter
 Joachim Pollak
 Isaac Samuel Reggio
 David Samoscz
 
 
 Yom-Tob Spitz
 Marcus Strelisker
 
 Samuel David Luzzatto
 Samuele Vita Zelman

References
 

Defunct newspapers published in Austria
Haskalah
Hebrew-language newspapers
Publications established in 1820
Publications disestablished in 1831